William Arndt (born August 13, 1993) is the quarterbacks coach for the Ottawa Redblacks of the Canadian Football League (CFL) and is a former professional gridiron football quarterback. He attended Western Connecticut State University, where he played college football. Arndt made his professional debut in 2019 for the Ottawa Redblacks.

College career 
At the time of this graduation Arndt held multiple Western Connecticut State University records including; most passing yards in a career (7,940 yards), total offense (9,248 yards), passing touchdowns (73), and total touchdowns (91). He was named the team captain for three seasons, and was twice named to the All MASCAC Academic Team.

Professional career

Ottawa Redblacks 
Following his time in Western Canada Arndt signed with the Ottawa Redblacks on September 13, 2017. Arndt spent the closing three months of the season learning from the sideline. He was re-signed by the team on January 3, 2018. Arndt spent the entire 2018 season in the CFL as a backup quarterback behind Trevor Harris. For most of the 2019 season Arndt was the third sting quarterback behind Dominique Davis and Jonathan Jennings. Arndt came in relief of starting Jennings in the second half of the team's Week 15 loss to the BC Lions. As the team fell to a record of 3-11 Arndt was named the starting quarterback for the team's Week 18 match against the Toronto Argonauts. In his first career start Arndt completed 28 of 42 pass attempts for 288 yards with two passing touchdowns and three interceptions. Arndt started the following match against the division leading Ti-Cats but was unable to effectively move the ball down the field, completing 17 of 30 pass attempts for only 112 yards with no touchdowns or interceptions. Arndt made his third and final start of the season in the second last game of the season. He was released by the Redblacks on January 23, 2020.

BC Lions
Arndt signed with the BC Lions on January 30, 2020. However, he did not play in 2020 due to the cancellation of the 2020 CFL season and was then released during 2021 training camp on July 26, 2021.

Coaching career 
Arndt retired following his release by the BC Lions, and joined the Edmonton Elks as an offensive assistant on September 1, 2021. Arndt joined the Ottawa Redblacks as a quarterback coach in advance of the 2022 season. Following the season, in December 2022, Arndt announced that he was stepping down from his role as quarterbacks coach in order to pursue a playing opportunity.

Personal life 
Arndt portrayed Penn State play-caller Matt McGloin in the HBO movie Paterno, which was released in early April 2018.

References 

1993 births
Living people
American players of Canadian football
BC Lions players
Canadian football quarterbacks
Edmonton Elks coaches
Ottawa Redblacks coaches
Ottawa Redblacks players
People from Sandy Hook, Connecticut
Players of American football from Connecticut
Sportspeople from Fairfield County, Connecticut
Western Connecticut State Colonials football players